Lorenzo Morais (March 3, 1933 – August 30, 2013) was a Canadian politician. He served in the Legislative Assembly of New Brunswick from 1972 to 1974 as member of the Progressive Conservative Party of New Brunswick.

References

1933 births
2013 deaths
People from Caraquet
Progressive Conservative Party of New Brunswick MLAs